Union Electric Administration Building-Lakeside, also known as Willmore Lodge and Egan Lodge, is a historic administration building and retreat overlooking Lake of the Ozarks and located near Lakeside, Miller County, Missouri.  It was built in 1930 by Union Electric Company during the Bagnell Dam project. It is a one- to two-story, "V"-shaped Adirondack rustic style log building.  It has a stone veneer foundation and an intersecting gable, cedar shake roof.

It was added to the National Register of Historic Places in 1998, with a boundary increase in 2011.

References

Residential buildings on the National Register of Historic Places in Missouri
Residential buildings completed in 1930
Buildings and structures in Miller County, Missouri
National Register of Historic Places in Miller County, Missouri